WVPW is a public radio formatted broadcast radio station licensed to Buckhannon, West Virginia, serving Central West Virginia.  WVPW is owned and operated by West Virginia Educational Broadcasting Authority.

History
The station was originally licensed to West Virginia Wesleyan College in Buckhannon, WV as WVWC. WVWC was believed to be the first high power public radio station in West Virginia. WVWC became a founding member of National Public Radio in 1971, broadcasting the first episode of NPR’s flagship program All Things Considered in May, 1971. WVWC was given authorization to broadcast at the relatively high power signal of 14,000 watts because of the United States National Radio Quiet Zone. West Virginia Wesleyan College is located within the USNRQZ. The tower for WVWC was located 5 miles west of Weston, WV, just outside of the USNRQZ. The station’s powerful signal was given because the tower’s location was approximately 18 miles from Buckhannon, and a strong signal was needed to reach Buckhannon. In 1975, West Virginia Wesleyan College agreed to sell the station to the new West Virginia Public Radio network, and its call sign was changed to WVPW.

Translators
In addition to the main station, WVPW is relayed by three FM translators to widen its broadcast area.  Both translators are owned and operated by West Virginia Educational Broadcasting Authority.

References

External links
West Virginia Public Broadcasting Online

NPR member stations
VPW